This is a list of companies ever listed on the Athens Stock Exchange, since its foundation date back in 1876.

Airlines

Banks

Casinos & Gambling

Chemicals

Commercial Vehicles & Parts

Construction

Electricity

Energy

Food & Beverages

Gaming and lodging

General Mining

Healthcare

Holding companies

Insurance

Leasing

Media & Entertainment

Oil & Gas

Personal and household goods

Passenger shipping

Plastics Industry

Retail trade

Telecommunications

Technology

Tobacco

Water

References

 
Economy of Greece
Economy of Athens
Stock Exchnage
Athens Stock Exchange
Stock exchange